Yolmer Carlos Javier Sánchez (born June 29, 1992) is a Venezuelan professional baseball infielder in the Atlanta Braves organization. He made his Major League Baseball (MLB) debut in 2014 with the Chicago White Sox, and has also played in MLB for the Boston Red Sox and New York Mets. Prior to the 2017 season, he was known as Carlos Sánchez. He led the American League in triples in 2018, and won a Gold Glove Award in 2019 at second base.

Career

Chicago White Sox
Sánchez signed with the Chicago White Sox as an international free agent in 2009. He played in the Dominican Summer League (DSL) for the DSL White Sox in 2009 (playing shortstop primarily) and 2010 (playing third base primarily). The next season, playing second base primarily, he split the year between the Bristol White Sox of the Rookie-level Appalachian League and the Kannapolis Intimidators of the Class A South Atlantic League, finishing the year batting .286/.354/.343  batting average with 30 runs batted in and 48 runs scored in 68 games.

During the 2012 season, Sánchez moved quickly through the White Sox system. He started the season with Class A-Advanced Winston-Salem then moved to Double-A Birmingham Barons, and then eventually Triple-A Charlotte Knights. He was named to appear in the 2012 All-Star Futures Game while playing for the Winston-Salem Dash of the Class A-Advanced Carolina League, and was named a Carolina League Post-Season All Star. Sánchez hit a combined .323/.378/.403, 169 hits, 1 home run, 25 doubles, 7 triples, 79 runs, 56 RBI, 26 stolen bases in 133 games. He was named an MILB.com Organization All Star.

The White Sox invited Sánchez to spring training as a non-roster invitee in 2013, and he ranked as the White Sox' number four prospect. Sánchez spent the entire 2013 season at Triple-A Charlotte, where he batted .241/.293/.296 in 432 at bats, 50 runs, 20 doubles, 2 triples, no home runs, 28 runs batted in, 29 walks, 76 strikeouts and 16 SBs.

Sánchez was added to the 40-man roster on November 20, 2013. On July 13, 2014, the White Sox promoted Sánchez to the MLB roster and he made his MLB debut that same day going 0-for-5 with two strikeouts. Sanchez was sent down to Charlotte after the game, but was recalled to Chicago on August 22, after the White Sox traded Gordon Beckham. In 2014 with the White Sox, he batted .250/.269/.300 in 100 at bats. He was named an MILB.com Organization All Star.

In 2015 with the White Sox, he batted .224/.268/.326 in 389 at bats, and in 2016 he batted .208/.236/.357 in 154 at bats.

Sánchez announced that he would go by his first name, Yolmer, starting from the 2017 season, rather than his middle name of Carlos. In doing so, he became the first player named Yolmer in MLB history. In 2017, he batted .267/.319/.413 with a career-high 12 home runs in 484 at bats, and was second in the AL with 8 triples.

In 2018, playing third base primarily, he batted .242/.306/.372 in 600 at bats with a career-high 14 stolen bases, and led the AL with 10 triples. He received the MLBPAA White Sox Heart and Hustle Award.

In 2019, playing second base primarily, Sánchez batted .252/.318/.321 in 496 at bats with two home runs and 42 RBIs, with the lowest slugging percentage and isolated power (0.69) in the major leagues, and the highest opposite field percentage of all major league batters (34.2%). On defense, he made 416 assists, turned 108 double plays and had an 11 Defensive Runs Saved (DRS) rating, all best in the American League among second basemen. He won a Gold Glove Award at second base.

Sánchez was released on November 25, 2019.

San Francisco Giants
Sánchez signed a minor league contract with the San Francisco Giants on January 31, 2020. He did not play in their farm system due to cancelation of the 2020 minor-league season. He was released by the Giants organization on August 21, 2020.

Return to White Sox
On August 25, 2020, Sánchez signed a minor league contract with the Chicago White Sox organization. On August 31, he was added to the White Sox' 40-man roster. Overall with the 2020 Chicago White Sox, Sánchez batted .313 with one home run and one RBI in 11 games.

Baltimore Orioles
On October 30, 2020, Sánchez was claimed off waivers by the Baltimore Orioles. On March 27, 2021, he was designated for assignment following the acquisition of Adam Plutko. On March 30, Sánchez was granted his release by the Orioles.

Atlanta Braves
On March 31, 2021, Sánchez signed a minor league contract with the Atlanta Braves organization. In 102 games with the Triple-A Gwinnett Braves, he batted .216 with nine home runs and 35 RBIs. He elected free agency on November 7, 2021.

Boston Red Sox
On February 9, 2022, Sánchez signed a minor league contract with the Boston Red Sox that included an invitation to spring training. He began the season in Triple-A with the Worcester Red Sox. Sánchez was added to Boston's active roster on June 27 for a series in Toronto, and appeared in one game for Boston. He was returned to Worcester on June 30 and removed from the 40-man roster. He was re-added to Boston's active roster on July 22, then was designated for assignment on August 16. In 14 games for Boston, Sánchez batted .108 (4-for-37) with two RBIs.

New York Mets
On August 18, 2022, Sánchez was claimed off waivers by the New York Mets. On August 27, he was designated for assignment. With the Mets, he appeared defensively in three games but did not have a plate appearance.

Atlanta Braves (second stint)
On January 24, 2023, Sánchez signed a minor league contract with the Atlanta Braves organization.

See also
 List of Major League Baseball players from Venezuela

References

External links

1992 births
Living people
Sportspeople from Maracay
Major League Baseball designated hitters
Major League Baseball players from Venezuela
Major League Baseball second basemen
Major League Baseball shortstops
Major League Baseball third basemen
Gold Glove Award winners
Chicago White Sox players
Boston Red Sox players
New York Mets players
Birmingham Barons players
Bristol White Sox players
Charlotte Knights players
Dominican Summer League White Sox players
Gwinnett Stripers players
Kannapolis Intimidators players
Salt River Rafters players
Syracuse Mets players
Tiburones de La Guaira players
Winston-Salem Dash players
Worcester Red Sox players
Venezuelan expatriate baseball players in the Dominican Republic
Venezuelan expatriate baseball players in the United States